Edward W. North was the twenty-first mayor of Charleston, South Carolina, serving three consecutive terms from 1833 to 1836.

North was born in 1778 and died on May 15, 1843. He is buried at Saint Johns Lutheran Church Cemetery in Charleston, South Carolina.

References

Mayors of Charleston, South Carolina
1778 births
1843 deaths